Croatian identity card is an identity document issued in Croatia. Any Croatian citizen who is resident in Croatia can obtain an ID card and it is compulsory for all citizens over the age of 18. This document is issued by the police on behalf of the Ministry of the Interior.

The 2003, the 2013 and the 2021 version of the ID card are valid as travel documents in most of Europe. The pre-2003 version is valid only in Croatia.

History

SR Croatia issued identity cards during the time SFR Yugoslavia since 1974. When the country became independent, a new identity card replaced the old one with a two-year transition period.

Physical appearance
Similarly to a credit card, the identity card is plastic and rectangular in shape, with dimensions .

2003 version

On the left side is a hologram, on the right side is the photograph of the bearer. On the top edge of the card, the name of Republic of Croatia available in two languages, Croatian and English (REPUBLIKA HRVATSKA / REPUBLIC OF CROATIA), below the name of the card is available in the same two languages (OSOBNA ISKAZNICA / IDENTITY CARD).

The descriptions of the fields are printed in Croatian and English.

Front side:
Surname
Name
Sex
Identity Card Number
Citizenship
Signature
Date of birth
Date of expiry

Back side:
Residence and address
Issued by
Date of issue
Machine-readable data

2013 version

The 2013 version was redesigned to be compatible for the installation of an Electronic identity card chip. Issuing of electronic ID cards began in 2015. In addition to all data on the 2003 version, the back side of the new ID card also features the Personal identification number (OIB).

2021 version
Second generation Croatian electronic ID came out in 2021. The 2nd of August 2021. was the first day when the applications for the new ID card started to be accepted. The new, second generation eID was a change that followed new EU Regulation 2019/1157. Thus the greatest change is that second generation eID is also bio-metric. This change is followed with new Certilia application that enables citizens to use the new eID to sign electronic documents with digital signature.

Fines
Persons over the age of 18, and who do not have a valid ID, can pay a fine from 3,000 up to 4,500 kn. Failure to show a valid ID to a police officer in a public place can result in a fine of 200 kn.

International travel

Since Croatia's accession to the EU, in accordance with the Treaty of Accession 2011, on 1 July 2013 the Croatian identity card (except for the pre-2003 version) became a valid travel document within the entire European Economic Area. Croatia finished negotiating their accession to the EEA in November 2013.

Today, the card is a valid travel document in almost all of Europe (except Belarus, Russia, Ukraine and United Kingdom), as well as in Georgia, and French overseas territories.

See also
Croatian passport
Croatian nationality law
National identity cards in the European Economic Area
List of identity card policies by country

References

External links
 eID - electronic ID web portal
 Identity card law 
 Picture of the ID
 Notification from Croatian Ministry of the Interior 
 Kako se mijenjala osobna iskaznica: Prve su bile ‘plahtaste‘, a treće izdanje izazvalo je buru 

ID card
Croatia